William Blackadder (9 January 1899 – 1977) was an English professional footballer who played as a left half. He started his career with Burnley, but never made a senior appearance for the club. In 1924, he joined Football League Third Division North side Accrington Stanley and played 17 league matches during the 1924–25 season. Blackadder left Accrington in 1925 and moved into non-League football with Chorley, Clitheroe and Lancaster Town.

References

1899 births
1977 deaths
People from Padiham
English footballers
Association football wing halves
Burnley F.C. players
Accrington Stanley F.C. (1891) players
Chorley F.C. players
Clitheroe F.C. players
Lancaster City F.C. players
English Football League players